Old Men in New Cars, (2002) is a Danish action comedy film directed by Lasse Spang Olsen. The movie stars Kim Bodnia, Nikolaj Lie Kaas, and Tomas Villum Jensen. It is a prequel to Olsen's 1999 comedy In China They Eat Dogs.

Synopsis
The last wish of the dying "Monk" is for his foster child, Harald, to find his real son, Ludvig. But Ludvig is currently in a Swedish prison cell. Peter and Martin – the two chefs – help to get him out and soon father and son meet for the first time in their lives. They get on from the word go, but now dad needs a liver transplant in Ecuador and Ludvig and Harald set about raising the wherewithal. Everything goes wrong when they try to rob a bank, though they meet Mille, who puts them onto a new trail, and Peter and Martin also make a contribution. However, soon they have the cops and the anti-terror corps on their tails.

Cast
 Kim Bodnia — Harald
 Nikolaj Lie Kaas — Martin
 Tomas Villum Jensen — Peter
 Brian Patterson — Vuk
 Torkel Petersson — Ludwig
 Iben Hjejle — Mille
 Jens Okking — Munken
 Jacob Haugaard — Erling
 Slavko Labovic — Ratko
 Thomas Rode Andersen — Dan Hansen

References

External links

2002 films
2000s Danish-language films
2000s action comedy films
Films about the Serbian Mafia
Films with screenplays by Anders Thomas Jensen
2002 comedy films
Danish action comedy films